Stephan Farffler (1633 – October 24, 1689), sometimes spelled Stephan Farfler, was a German watchmaker of the seventeenth century whose invention of a manumotive carriage in 1655 is widely considered to have been the first self-propelled wheelchair. The three-wheeled device is also believed to have been a precursor to the modern-day tricycle and bicycle.

Farffler, who was either a paraplegic or an amputee, also created a device for turning an hourglass at regular intervals and added chimes to the clocktower of Altdorf bei Nürnberg.

the German WiKi says: either paraplegic as a result of an accident when aged three years; others describe him as a human with crippled legs  („verkrüppelten“ - which could also mean disfigured or malformed and this might, for onlookers, be an accurate description when, as said, the accident happened at a very young age which would likely impair normal growth of the affected limbs)

See also
List of motorized trikes

References 

17th-century German inventors
People with paraplegia
German amputees
German watchmakers (people)
1633 births
1689 deaths
People from Altdorf bei Nürnberg
Sustainable transport pioneers